Lataxiena solenosteiroides is a species of sea snail, a marine gastropod mollusc, in the family Muricidae, the murex snails or rock snails.

Description
The length of the shell attains 28.7 mm.

Distribution
This species occurs off Madras, India.

References

solenosteiroides
Gastropods described in 2013